The British Gas Swimming Championships (50 m) 2009 were held at the Ponds Forge International Sports Centre, Sheffield from 16–20 March 2009. They also doubled as the first trials for the 2009 World Aquatics Championships. They were organised by British Swimming and sponsored by British Gas.

Qualification for the World Championships team was automatic for swimmers finishing in first place in all Olympic events. An additional space on the team was identified from the 2009 Scottish Championships, 25–28 June 2009 in Glasgow.

Medal winners

Men's events

Key: WR=World record; ER=European record; CR=Commonwealth record; NR=National record

Women's events

Key: WR=World record; ER=European record; CR=Commonwealth record; NR=National record

See also
British Swimming
List of British Swimming Championships champions
List of British records in swimming
2009 in swimming

References

2009
2009 in swimming
2009 in British sport